The streets of Detroit, in the U.S. state of Michigan, hosted Formula One racing, and later CART racing, between the 1982 and 1991 seasons. The street circuit (course) was set up near the Renaissance Center and the Cobo Arena, also including a small part of the M-1 highway, also known as Woodward Avenue. The circuit will be reopened in June 2023 for the IndyCar Detroit Grand Prix race with a modified and shortened layout.

Formula One

Created largely in an effort to improve the city's international image, the race meant that the United States would host three Grands Prix in the 1982 season (the other two US races, Long Beach and Las Vegas, had been added to the schedule for similar purposes), the only nation in F1 history to do so until the 2020 season, when Italy also hosted three Grands Prix: Monza, Mugello, and Imola. The inaugural Detroit Grand Prix saw John Watson claim victory after starting in 17th place, the lowest grid position for an eventual race winner on a street circuit. (Watson would break his own record at Long Beach the next year by winning from 22nd place.)

The Detroit street circuit's place in Formula One history was assured when Michele Alboreto won the 1983 race driving a Tyrrell 011. This was the last of 155 Grand Prix wins for the 3.0L Cosworth DFV V8 engine, dating back to its debut at the 1967 Dutch Grand Prix in the hands of dual World Champion Jim Clark. It was also the last of 23 Formula One race wins for Tyrrell, who had won their first Grand Prix at the 1971 Spanish Grand Prix with that year's World Champion Jackie Stewart driving the Tyrrell 003.

The race soon gained a reputation for being horrendously demanding and gruelling, with the very bumpy track often breaking up badly under the consistently hot weather. It was perhaps the single hardest race on both car and driver in Formula One during the 1980s, often producing races of attrition in which a large number of cars would retire due to mechanical breakage or contact with the narrow concrete walls. Brakes and gearboxes in particular were tested to their breaking points—the drivers had to brake hard more than 20 times per lap and change gear around 50 to 60 times in one lap (cars still had manual gearboxes in those days), for 62 laps usually lasting around 1 minute and 45 seconds. At least half the field retired in each race; it was thus considered an achievement if a driver could even finish the race, let alone win it.

The 1984 race, won by reigning World Champion Nelson Piquet, tied an F1 road course record by featuring 20 retirements. Shortly after the race, impurities were found in the water injection system of Martin Brundle's Tyrrell, causing him to be stripped of his 2nd-place finish and Tyrrell (by then the only team still using the naturally-aspirated DFV) to be disqualified from the entire 1984 season. The race's five classified finishers (discounting Brundle) is beaten only by the 1966 Monaco Grand Prix.

By 1985, Detroit was the sole American venue on the F1 calendar—Las Vegas had been dropped after 1982, Long Beach switched to Champ Car for 1984, and a new event in Dallas only lasted one year after the heat and deteriorating track conditions almost saw it cancelled on the morning of the race. That year saw Ayrton Senna take pole position, and he went on to enjoy substantial success at the circuit, winning the 1986, 1987, and 1988 races there, as well as taking further pole positions in 1986 and 1988.

The track was only moderately received by the drivers, and was especially disliked by world champions Alain Prost and Nelson Piquet. Despite his open dislike of the track, Prost did finish second in 1988, and third in 1986 and 1987 (all for McLaren). Piquet, who generally disliked street circuits (with the exception of the faster and more open Adelaide circuit in Australia), won at Detroit in 1984 and came second to Senna in 1987. Embarrassingly, Piquet hit the wall during practice for the 1988 race when he spun his Lotus-Honda into the wall coming out of turn 1. At the time, the Lotus had been carrying an onboard camera for some recorded laps.

The 1988 race, similar to the failed Dallas event, was extremely hot, and the circuit broke up very badly due to the intense heat and humidity. After the race, the drivers were far more vocal in their criticism of the track, with race winner Senna comparing driving on the crumbled surface to driving in heavy rain. 1988 subsequently proved to be the last F1 race in Detroit, as the sport's governing body FISA ruled that its temporary pit area wasn't up to the required standard for a World Championship race. The United States Grand Prix moved to another street circuit in Phoenix, Arizona, while the Detroit event became a CART race.

Trans-Am
Starting in 1984, the SCCA Trans-Am Series held a support race during the Grand Prix weekend. The Motor City 100 was often regarded as one of the most important events of the Trans-Am schedule due to the increased television and sponsor exposure, made possible by the international broadcast of the Grand Prix. The Trans-Am race wasn't popular with the Formula One drivers though with the heavy and powerful Trans-Am cars with their huge rear wheels having a tendency to break up the track, already in a suspect state thanks to the heat of the summer when the races were scheduled. This often made the Grands Prix a more difficult prospect due to drivers having to go offline on to the 'dirty' part of the road to avoid problem areas on the track surface.

CART
Three CART races were held on the track which was altered slightly with the removal of the unpopular chicane immediately prior to the pits. Emerson Fittipaldi won the first and last races and Michael Andretti won the second race; Andretti also won pole position for each Detroit race. The final race featured an unusual lack of attrition as nearly 3/4 of the drivers finished.

The race was not economically viable for the city, so the venue was changed to a temporary course on Belle Isle for the 1992 season. That event lasted until 2001 as a CART event and was briefly revived for the 2007 and 2008 American Le Mans Series and IndyCar Series seasons, and then again from 2012 through 2019. There was no race in 2020 due to the COVID-19 pandemic. The race returned for both 2021 and 2022 with the race moving to a new location for 2023 (See next section for more details).

IndyCar
It was announced on November 3, 2021, that the IndyCar Series Detroit Grand Prix would be moved from Belle Isle Circuit back to the downtown circuit beginning in 2023. The new circuit is significantly smaller and features fewer corners than the original Detroit Street Circuit, with only two of the original circuit's corners being repurposed for the new circuit. Penske entertainment president Bud Denker said that while bringing back the original circuit layout was considered it was ultimately not used due to it the higher costs of resurfacing the larger circuit, the impact closing the side streets would have on local businesses operating on the circuit would have, and having a negative effect on traffic in the area. This new circuit focuses mostly on Atwater Street and East Jefferson Avenue and only features ten corners compared to the eighteen corners the original circuit had.

Winners

Formula One

CART

Atlantics / Indy Lights

Trans-Am Motor City 100

Lap records

The official fastest race lap records at the Detroit Street Circuit are listed as:

References

External links

History of Detroit
Motorsport venues in Michigan
IndyCar Series races
Formula One circuits
Champ Car circuits
United States Grand Prix
Detroit Indy Grand Prix